Maia is a feminine given name. It may be in reference to the mythic mother of Hermes. It is also a popular Māori name meaning "brave or confident."

Notable people with the name include:

 maia arson crimew, Swiss developer and computer hacker
 Maia Bellon, American lawyer and environmentalist
Maia Brewton (born 1977), American actress
 Maia Estianty (born 1976), Indonesian singer
 Maia Campbell (born 1976), American film and television actress
 Maia Chiburdanidze (born 1961), Georgian chess grandmaster
 Maia Lewis, New Zealand women's cricketer
 Maia Makhateli, Georgian ballet dancer
 Maia Mitchell (born 1993), Australian actress
 Maia Morgenstern (born 1962), Romanian film and stage actress
 Maia (singer), stage name of Colombian singer Mónica Andrea Vives Orozco
 Maia Sandu (born 1972), Moldovan politician
 Maia Shibutani (born 1994), American ice dancer

See also
Maia (surname), a Portuguese surname

Notes

Given names of Greek language origin
Feminine given names